The Birmingham District is a geological area in the vicinity of Birmingham, Alabama, where the raw materials for making steel, limestone, iron ore, and coal are found together in abundance. The district includes Red Mountain, Jones Valley, and the Warrior and Cahaba coal fields in Central Alabama.

Industrial development
The industrial development of these resources began, in limited fashion, before the American Civil War (attracting the attention of Wilson's Raiders in the course of that conflict).

Beginning in 1871 with the founding of the City of Birmingham and the construction of the first blast furnaces, the development of the district enjoyed explosive growth, slowed only by a deficit of skilled labor and investment capital. This boom earned for Birmingham the nicknames "The Magic City" and "Pittsburgh of the South", and also spurred the growth of several independent industrial cities and dozens of company towns.

By the end of the 19th century, Birmingham was the third-largest exporter of pig iron in the world, producing 3/4 of United States exports. The region was also a major exporter of coal, and, as technology advanced, became a major steel producing district. With a few notable exceptions such as cast iron pipes and fittings, most of the district's economic output was in basic materials rather than in finished consumer products.

Documentation and preservation
As the steel-making industry has diminished in its economic importance to the district, many of the sites have been abandoned or dismantled. Preservationists are attempting to document and preserve the physical evidence of Birmingham's industrial history. In the spring of 1993 a large-scale survey was undertaken for the Birmingham Historical Society and the Historic American Buildings Survey/Historic American Engineering Record. The results of that survey were published in the book Birmingham Bound.

See also
Aldrich Coal Mine Museum
American Cast Iron Pipe Company
Automotive Historic District
Birmingham Southern Railroad
Boshell's Mill
Brierfield Furnace
Brookside, Alabama
Dora, Alabama
Drummond Company
Finley Roundhouse
Flintridge Building
Heart of Dixie Railroad Museum
Holt Lock and Dam
Iron & Steel Museum of Alabama
James H. Miller Jr. Electric Generating Plant
McWane
Norfolk and Western 611
Norfolk and Western 1218
O'Neal Steel
Pyne Mine
Red Mountain (Birmingham)
Red Mountain Expressway Cut
Republic Steel
Ruffner Mountain Nature Preserve
Shelby Iron Company
Sloss Furnaces
Sloss Mines
Tannehill Furnace
Tennessee Coal, Iron and Railroad Company
Vulcan statue
Wilson Dam
Woodward Iron Company

References

External links
Historic American Engineering Record (HAER) documentation, filed under Bessemer, Jefferson County, AL:

HAER documentation, filed under Birmingham, Jefferson County, AL:

Other HAER documentation:

Geography of Birmingham, Alabama
Historic American Engineering Record in Alabama
Industrial history of the United States
Regions of Alabama